Peace is the eighth and final studio album by British pop duo Eurythmics, released on 19 October 1999 by RCA Records. It was the band's first album of new material in 10 years, following 1989's We Too Are One.

Release and reception
Following their first performance together in eight years at a record company party in 1998, Annie Lennox and David A. Stewart began writing and recording together for the first time since 1989. The album's title was designed to reflect the duo's ongoing concern with global conflict and world peace. It was promoted with a concert on the Greenpeace vessel Rainbow Warrior II, where they played a mixture of old and new songs. A 24-date world tour, titled the Peacetour, followed soon after, with all profits donated to Amnesty International and Greenpeace. The final show of the tour, on 6 December 1999 at the London Docklands Arena, was filmed and released on VHS and DVD.

Singles
"I Saved the World Today" served as the lead single from the album, reaching number 11 on the UK Singles Chart—their highest-charting single there since 1986. The second single, "17 Again", was released in January 2000. It reached the UK top 30 and topped the US Hot Dance Club Play chart. In May 2000, "Peace Is Just a Word" was released as a promotional single in the United Kingdom with "Beautiful Child" as its B-side.

2005 re-release
On 14 November 2005, Sony BMG repackaged and released Eurythmics' back catalogue as "Deluxe Edition Reissues". Each of their eight studio albums' original track listings were supplemented with bonus tracks and remixes. For unknown reasons, many songs on the 2005 reissue of Peace are alternate mixes compared to the original 1999 release. The most dramatically different mix is "I've Tried Everything", which is more upbeat with additional drums. Other songs with mix differences include "17 Again", "I Saved the World Today", "Forever" and "Power to the Meek" (missing a verse from the original version), and live tracks were substituted for the original studio versions of "I Want It All" and "Peace Is Just a Word".

Critical reception

Critics were generally impressed with the album, although NME commented that it "lacked the power" of their previous releases. Q magazine opined that the release of the album "quietly acknowledged that their solo careers had failed", despite the fact that both of Lennox's solo albums up to that point had reached number one in the UK and been certified multi-platinum in both the UK and US.

Track listing

Personnel
Credits adapted from the liner notes of Peace.

Eurythmics
 Dave Stewart – guitars
 Annie Lennox – vocals

Additional musicians

 Andy Wright – programming, keyboards, live percussion
 Chucho Merchán – bass 
 Dave Catlin-Birch – bass 
 Steve Lewinson – bass 
 Pete Lewinson – drums 
 Chris Sharrock – drums 
 David Whitaker – strings orchestration 
 Pro Arte Orchestra of London – orchestra
 Colin Sheen – orchestra coordination

Technical

 Eurythmics – production
 Andy Wright – additional production
 Nick Addison – engineering
 Graham Dominy – engineering assistance
 Ash Howes – mixing at Whitfield Street Studios (London)
 David Russell – mixing assistance
 Gary McGovern – technical supervisor
 Ian Cooper – mastering at Metropolis Mastering (London)
 Stephen McLaughlin – strings engineering

Artwork
 Richard Avedon – sleeve photography
 Laurence Stevens – sleeve design, graphics

Charts

Weekly charts

Year-end charts

Certifications

References

1999 albums
19 Recordings albums
Albums produced by David A. Stewart
Arista Records albums
Eurythmics albums
RCA Records albums
Albums recorded at The Church Studios